The 2022 Greenville Triumph SC season will be the fourth season in the soccer team's history, all of which they've competed in USL League One, a league in the third division of American soccer.  They will play their home games at Legacy Early College Field. John Harkes will be managing the club for his fourth season. Greenville finished in 2nd-place the previous season, losing the 2021 final to Union Omaha.

Club

Roster

Competitions

Exhibitions

USL League One

Standings

Match results

USL1 Playoffs

U.S. Open Cup

References

Greenville Triumph SC seasons
Greenville Triumph SC
Greenville Triumph SC
Greenville Triumph SC